John Wesley Judd  (18 February 1840 – 3 March 1916) was a British geologist.

Biography 
He was born in Portsmouth the son of George and Jannette Judd. At the age of 8, he moved to London, and went to school in Camberwell. After leaving school, Judd became a school-teacher in Horncastle, Lincolnshire until 1863, when he became a student at the Royal School of Mines. From 1867 - 1870, Judd worked for the Geological Survey of England and Wales, mapping Rutland, before joining the Education Department, under Matthew Arnold, as an Inspector of Schools in 1871. In his spare time, Judd continued his geological studies in Scotland, and later in the volcanic districts of Italy. He returned to Imperial College in 1876, succeeding Sir Andrew Ramsey as Professor of Geology.

He was elected a Fellow of the Royal Society in 1877, having been nominated by Charles Darwin, George Julius Poulett Scrope, Nevil Maskelyne and Edward Hull, among others. He was President of the Geological Society between 1886 and 1888 and awarded their Wollaston Medal in 1891. He was later Dean of the Royal College of Science, and Vice-President of the Royal Society from 1902-1904. He retired from Imperial College in 1905.

Notable pupils of his include Edgeworth David, William Fraser Hume and Frederick Chapman.

He married in 1878 Jeannie Frances, daughter of John Jeyes.

Works

References

External links
JUDD, Professor John Wesley (1840-1916) at Archives in London and the M25 area.
 
 
John Wesley Judd C.B., LL.D., F.R.S., F.G.S. Biography, Pioneers of the British Geological Survey

1840 births
1916 deaths
Scientists from Portsmouth
Companions of the Order of the Bath
19th-century British geologists
Fellows of the Royal Society
Wollaston Medal winners
Fellows of the Geological Society of London